Nikwax Analogy is a two-component fabric system for weatherproof clothing based on "biomimicry" of fur (the system was originally called "Nikwax Biological Analogy").

Technology
The key to the system is the inner "pump" layer which is designed to move moisture from one face to the other by means of capillary depression (a surface tension effect causing fluid to move along a tube in the direction of increasing diameter).  Combined with an outer layer that slows down incoming rain and wind, the "pump" layer is able to push water away from the wearer at a rate which should keep them dry.  Since both components of the system are, by themselves, porous and air-permeable, the Analogy system is considerably more breathable than waterproofs relying on a non-porous layer.  Unlike most "waterproof breathable" fabrics, Analogy can pass out liquid water as well as vapour.

Unlike a conventional waterproof fabric, Analogy would fail a hydrostatic head test (if used to seal the bottom of a tube containing water, only a very short column could be supported). However, like fur, Analogy causes water to flow away from the body of the wearer and with water typically moving out faster than it arrives the garment is effectively waterproof from the wearer's point of view.  Without a formal seal required, Analogy does not need the taped seams required by e.g. Gore-Tex rain-wear, and punctures in the outer layer do not compromise the action of the twin-component design.

The "pump" layer and the shell fabric both rely on a durable water repellent treatment; this treatment in combination with the fabric structure of the "pump" layer creates the capillary depression effect that allows water to be driven away from the wearer. In common with other waterproof garment technologies, this water repellent treatment must be maintained in order to remain effective.

Characteristics
A factor of the two-fabric system is that it inevitably adds insulation, due to the requirement of the inner "pump" liner: being a fur substitute with a definite and designed structure it traps air as well as channeling water, which has an insulating effect.  While this can be useful in cooler conditions it is less suitable for higher temperature and/or high activity conditions where overheating is more of a problem than an alternative which provides less insulation.  Adding venting features to garments helps address this problem, but it is only a partial solution.  

Clothes made from Analogy can also be heavy compared to many examples of waterproof "hard shells" (but not necessarily to the combined weight of these and an insulating layer) and are relatively expensive.  Though the veracity of this may depend on the system it's compared to, as for many applications it means that fewer overall items need to be carried, potentially reducing the total garment count and expenditure. 
The weight issue has been addressed by the production of Nikwax Analogy Light which uses a lighter windproof outer with the same Pump Liner fabric, resulting in garments that are 19-20% lighter than the same style made in standard Analogy fabric. Examples of these are the Velez Adventure Light Smock, the Quito Jacket, the Vista Jacket and the Velez Adventure Trousers.

The high "breathability" of the system makes it more suitable than conventional "hard shell" waterproofs for general use, as opposed to only being used in foul weather.  This can offset the extra weight of the system, as extra garments for different conditions are less likely to be required.

Clothes and Market 
The main user of Analogy is Nikwax's sister company Páramo with some other small specialist suppliers also producing garments from it. While Analogy clothes have a dedicated following among UK mountaineers, Paramo distribution and marketing to the mass market and outside the UK seems to be extremely limited.

See also
Waterproof fabric

References

External links
 Nikwax technical summary

Science and technology in East Sussex
Technical fabrics
Wealden District